Anastassiya Vlassova (born 25 June 1996) is a Kazakhstani footballer who plays as a defender for Women's Championship club FC Okzhetpes and the Kazakhstan women's national team.

Career
Vlassova has been capped for the Kazakhstan national team, appearing for the team during the 2019 FIFA Women's World Cup qualifying cycle.

References

External links
 
 
 

1996 births
Living people
Kazakhstani women's footballers
Kazakhstan women's international footballers
Women's association football defenders
Kazakhstani people of Russian descent